Juraj Mikuš (born 30 November 1988) is a Slovak professional ice hockey defenceman currently playing for HC Dynamo Pardubice of the Czech Extraliga (ELH). Mikuš was drafted by the Toronto Maple Leafs in the fifth round of the 2007 NHL Entry Draft from HC Dukla Trenčín of Slovak Extraliga.

Playing career
After attending the Toronto Maple Leafs' pre-season training camp in 2009, he was assigned the Marlies, the Leafs' AHL affiliate, on 19 September 2009.

On 20 June 2012, Mikuš left the Maple Leafs organization and signed with HC Lev Praha of the Kontinental Hockey League.

After his second season in the KHL in 2013–14, Mikus initially signed a one-year extension to remain with Lev but was later released as a free agent as the club declared bankruptcy and withdrew from KHL participation. On 10 July 2014, Mikus opted to remain in Prague, signing a one-year deal with HC Sparta Praha of the Czech Extraliga.

He played in four seasons with Sparta Praha, before leaving as a free agent and agreeing to a one-year contract with fellow ELH club, HC Kometa Brno, on May 8, 2018.

Career statistics

Regular season and playoffs

International

References

External links

1988 births
HK Dukla Trenčín players
HC Dynamo Pardubice players
HC Kometa Brno players
HC Lev Praha players
Living people
Ice hockey players at the 2018 Winter Olympics
Olympic ice hockey players of Slovakia
Slovak ice hockey defencemen
HC Sparta Praha players
Toronto Maple Leafs draft picks
Toronto Marlies players
Sportspeople from Trenčín
Slovak expatriate ice hockey players in the Czech Republic
Slovak expatriate ice hockey players in Canada